Maxine Marilyn Penas (née Sluka) (October 6, 1946 – December 29, 2008) was an American politician and educator.

Born in Roseau, Minnesota, Penas went to Corbett College at Mount Saint Benedict in Crookston, Minnesota. She then graduated from Saint Benedict College in 1968. She was a school teacher and farmer, and lived in Badger, Minnesota. Penas served in the Minnesota House of Representatives from 2001 to 2006 and was a Republican. She died in Roseau, Minnesota after suffering a stroke.

Notes

External links

1946 births
2008 deaths
People from Roseau, Minnesota
College of Saint Benedict and Saint John's University alumni
Educators from Minnesota
American women educators
Women state legislators in Minnesota
Republican Party members of the Minnesota House of Representatives
21st-century American politicians
21st-century American women politicians
20th-century American women politicians
20th-century American politicians